Diamorpha is a genus of plants in the family Crassulaceae. It is sometimes included within the genus Sedum. It is monotypic, including only the species Diamorpha smallii (also known as elf orpine or Small's stonecrop ), an endemic of the southeastern United States. It becomes active in late fall and winter, blooms in late March, then dies. It has red succulent leaves that act to reflect light and hold water. Diamorpha smallii is found primarily on solution pools, shallow basins on rocky outcrops that contain seasonal pools. The plant is mainly found in Georgia, though populations have also been noted in Alabama, South Carolina, North Carolina, Tennessee, and Virginia. It is listed as an endangered species by the Tennessee Department of Environment and Conservation.

References

Crassulaceae
Monotypic Saxifragales genera
Flora of Georgia (U.S. state)
Crassulaceae genera